Roni Trần Bình Trong is a Finnish singer of Vietnamese ancestry who rose to popularity after placing sixth in Idols Finland 2, the Finnish version of Pop Idol. He was born in a refugee camp in Thailand, but went to Finland at the age of four months, and has lived most of his life in Hyvinkää, Finland.

Idols Finland 2 Performances
-Semi Finals: 
Separated by Usher   	
-Finals:
Top 7: I Still Haven't Found What I'm Looking For by U2 	 
Top 6: Poison by Alice Cooper

Discography

Albums 
 Idols: Finalistit 2005
 Since 1987 (debut album, 2006)
01. Call Me
02. Don't Wanna B Alone
03. The Time Is Now
04. This Song
05. Hello
06. SMS
07. Never Coming Back
08. All I Want
09. Imagine
10. Reason
11. I Want To Know
12. Cry On Me

Singles 
 "Don't Wanna B Alone" (2006)
 "Call Me" (2006)

Paris By Night Performances 
 PBN 84 In Atlanta: Passport to Music and Fashion - "Call Me" (2006)
 PBN 87 Talent Show: Finals - "All I Want" and "Vang Trang Khoc [Vietnamese song]"(2007)
 PBN 89 In Korea - "Tan Bien w/ Huynh Gia Tuan" (July 2007)

Notes

External links
Official site - available in both Finnish and English 	
Official myspace 	
MTV3 Biography 	
 (debut CD and samples) 	
	 

1987 births
Living people
Finnish pop singers
Idols (franchise) participants
Singers of Vietnamese descent
Vietnamese emigrants to Finland
Vietnamese-language singers
21st-century Finnish male singers